Adleman is a surname. Notable people with the surname include:

 Leonard Adleman (born 1945), American theoretical computer scientist and professor of computer science and molecular biology
 Robert H. Adleman (1919–1995), American novelist and historian
 Tim Adleman (born 1987), American baseball player

See also 
 Adelman
 Edelmann

References 

Jewish surnames
Yiddish-language surnames